1st Mounted Brigade may refer to:
1st (1st South Midland) Mounted Brigade, designation given to the 1st South Midland Mounted Brigade while serving with the 2nd Mounted Division in the Gallipoli Campaign
1st Mounted Brigade (United Kingdom), also known as 2/1st Highland Mounted Brigade
1st Mounted Brigade (Canada)